Greenpatch is a locality in the Jervis Bay Territory, Australia. It is located inside Boodere National Park.

Amenities 
Usually, the amenities there include:

 Fresh water
 Toilets
 Hot water showers
 Sheltered BBQ areas

Geography
Greenpatch is located on Aboriginal Land within Booderee National Park. It is located in close proximity to HMAS Creswell and Jervis Bay Village.

Wildlife
Greenpatch is home to many different kinds of Australian native flora and fauna, including kangaroos, kookaburras, rosellas, lorikeets, wombats and many more.

See also
 Jervis Bay Territory
 Jervis Bay Village
 Wreck Bay Village

References

External links
 Official website

Towns and villages in the Jervis Bay Territory